Tropidonophis elongatus, the Moluccan keelback, is a species of colubrid snake. It is found in Indonesia.

References

Tropidonophis
Reptiles of Indonesia
Reptiles described in 1865
Taxa named by Giorgio Jan